The 1939 UK & Ireland Greyhound Racing Year was the 14th year of greyhound racing in the United Kingdom and Ireland.

Roll of honour

Summary
Despite the outbreak of World War II, another ten tracks opened, buoyed on by the attendances and profits generated. Attendances and totalisator turnover at National Greyhound Racing Club (NGRC) licensed tracks was on course for a record year but was disrupted, with many tracks closing in the latter part of the year. A record 92,000 attended the 1939 English Greyhound Derby final at White City and the totalisator turnover for the final was £14,341 and for the meeting it was £114,780 which set a new record for a greyhound meeting. The race was won by Highland Rum.

The leading greyhound company, the Greyhound Racing Association (GRA) saw reduced profits, due to the closure of their London tracks from September. The operating net profit for 1939 was £151,000 and attendances at GRA tracks increased rose to 3,808,994.

Tracks
Oxford Stadium was one of twelve known tracks to open during the year, it was opened on 31 March by Lord Denham of the NGRC. Just four days later Lord Denham was opening the new Dagenham Greyhound Stadium. Castleford Whitwood Stadium raced for the first time and the Hull Kingston Rovers rugby league team sold the Craven Park stadium to the Greyhound Racing Company following financial difficulties. Ten thousand attended the first meeting at the City Stadium in Norwich.

Clapton Stadium underwent renovation and Bristol Rovers F.C. sold Eastville Stadium to the Bristol Greyhound Company for £12,000. The first General Manager was Lieut-Col Forsdike who was to become secretary of the NGRC. A successful professional punter called Len Franklin bought the flapping track site in West Caister with plans to open a new stadium.

Many tracks closed or were refused licences during 1939, for various reasons including the threat of bombing, staffing shortages and requisitioning by the authorities. Several would never reopen such as Battersea and Brixton.

Tracks opened

Competitions
Two new major events were introduced, the Birmingham Cup at Perry Barr and the Essex Vase at Romford Greyhound Stadium.

The Oaks and Pall Mall were suspended before their 1939 running and return in 1945. Juvenile Classic reached a second Grand National final coming home three lengths behind the winner Valiant Bob and Grosvenor Ferdinand upset the odds at Catford Stadium by holding off the challenge of hot favourite Black Peter by a head in the Gold Collar final.

Carmel Ash who finished runner-up to Highland Rum in the Derby final finished fourth behind Misty Law II in the Scottish Greyhound Derby final. The Scurry Gold Cup at the end of July went to a Derby Greyhound Stadium trained hound Silver Wire. Orlucks Best was one length behind Silver Wire and was representing trainer Charlie Ashley for a third consecutive final, winning one and finishing second twice and Gold Collar champion Grosvenor Ferdinand was third.  Gayhunter switched kennels from Harry Buck to Eddie Wright who steered the greyhound to the St Leger crown in November.

News
All identity books were microphotoed and stored in secret in case they were lost during the war years.

Ireland
The Irish provincial tracks had pressured the Irish Coursing Club since 1932, for the right to stage Ireland's premier event, the Irish Greyhound Derby which had been exclusively run in Dublin. During a vote in 1939, the club agreed to let Limerick Greyhound Stadium host the race and Cork Greyhound Stadium would hold the 1941 version.

Despite the Irish Derby prize money decreasing, the event at Limerick was a success. Marchin' Thro' Georgia impressed throughout. Even two track records by other greyhounds failed to stop the red fawn dog from going through the competition unbeaten. The runner-up and one of the two track record breakers, Irish Rambler was bought by English buyers and sent to West Ham Stadium. The trend of selling the best Irish hounds to England would continue for many years because of the purchasing power of the English and in particular the London owners.

Principal UK races

References 

Greyhound racing in the United Kingdom
Greyhound racing in the Republic of Ireland
1939 in British sport
1939 in Irish sport
1939 in Welsh sport
1939 in Scottish sport